Luis Gabriel Valenzuela Toledo (born 22 February 1988) is a Chilean footballer who plays as a midfielder for Deportes Melipilla.

Career
He began his career as a youth player as a U-12 in Colo-Colo, the most successful team in Chile, then he was promoted to the adult team in 2006, aged 18, where he made his debut in August 2006 and at the end of the season, won Clausura 2006 Chilean Championship along with his team members Alexis and Humberto Suazo. Also ended up as the runner-up in Copa Sudamericana 2006 under the lead management of Claudio Borghi.  He stayed in Colo-Colo until 2007.  Then he joined Santiago Morning in 2008. After the contract ended, he signed with Unión Temuco in 2009.  In 2010, he played with Curicó Unido a team from the Chilean Primera División B. Beginning the season 2010/2011, he had agreed upon a contract with Unión San Felipe.

On August 2011, ArceSports (the footballer's agent) in association with Soccer Soccer Sport in Brazil, got a pre-contract between Luis Valenzuela and Ceará Sporting Club for a five-year period with this Campeonato Brasileiro Série A team.

On 2014, he is signed for the Chilean club O'Higgins.

Personal life
He is well-known by his nickname Larry Valenzuela.

Honours

Club
 Colo-Colo
Primera División de Chile (1): 2006 Clausura
Copa Sudamericana (1): Runner-up 2006

References

External links
Luis Valenzuela at MemoriaWanderers  
 Dale Albo interview in Colo-Colo
 BDFA Profile
 ArceSports Official site (footballer's agent)

1988 births
Living people
People from Puente Alto
Chilean footballers
Colo-Colo footballers
Deportes Temuco footballers
Santiago Morning footballers
Curicó Unido footballers
Unión San Felipe footballers
C.D. Antofagasta footballers
O'Higgins F.C. footballers
Cobresal footballers
Deportes Melipilla footballers
Santiago Wanderers footballers
Ñublense footballers
Chilean Primera División players
Primera B de Chile players
Tercera División de Chile players
Segunda División Profesional de Chile players
Footballers from Santiago
Association football midfielders